Ponometia macdunnoughi is a bird-dropping moth in the family Noctuidae first described by William Barnes and Foster Hendrickson Benjamin in 1923. It is found in North America.

The MONA or Hodges number for Ponometia macdunnoughi is 9116.

References

Further reading

 
 
 

Acontiinae
Articles created by Qbugbot
Moths described in 1923